A Universe from Nothing: Why There Is Something Rather than Nothing is a non-fiction book by the physicist Lawrence M. Krauss, initially published on January 10, 2012 by Free Press. It discusses modern cosmogony and its implications for the debate about the existence of God. The main theme of the book is how "we have discovered that all signs suggest a universe that could and plausibly did arise from a deeper nothing—involving the absence of space itself and—which may one day return to nothing via processes that may not only be comprehensible but also processes that do not require any external control or direction."

Publication 
The book ends with an afterword by Richard Dawkins in which he compares the book to On the Origin of Species — a comparison that Krauss himself called "pretentious". Christopher Hitchens had agreed to write a foreword for the book prior to his death but was too ill to complete it. To write the book, Krauss expanded material from a lecture on the cosmological implications of a flat expanding universe he gave to the Richard Dawkins Foundation at the 2009 Atheist Alliance International conference. The book appeared on The New York Times bestseller list on January 29, 2012.

Reception 
In The New York Times, philosopher of science and physicist David Albert said the book failed to live up to its title; he said Krauss dismissed concerns about what Albert calls his misuse of the term nothing, since if matter comes from relativistic quantum fields, the question becomes where did those fields come from, which Krauss does not discuss.

Caleb Scharf, writing in Nature, said that "it would be easy for this remarkable story to revel in self-congratulation, but Krauss steers it soberly and with grace".

Ray Jayawardhana, Canada Research Chair in observational astrophysics at the University of Toronto, wrote for The Globe and Mail that Krauss "delivers a spirited, fast-paced romp through modern cosmology and its strong underpinnings in astronomical observations and particle physics theory" and that he "makes a persuasive case that the ultimate question of cosmic origin – how something, namely the universe, could arise from nothing – belongs in the realm of science rather than theology or philosophy".

In New Scientist, Michael Brooks wrote, "Krauss will be preaching only to the converted. That said, we should be happy to be preached to so intelligently. The same can't be said about the Dawkins afterword, which is both superfluous and silly."

Commenting on the philosophical debate sparked by the book, the physicist Sean M. Carroll asked, "Do advances in modern physics and cosmology help us address these underlying questions, of why there is something called the universe at all, and why there are things called 'the laws of physics,' and why those laws seem to take the form of quantum mechanics, and why some particular wave function and Hamiltonian? In a word: no. I don't see how they could."

See also
 Problem of why there is anything at all
 Quantum fluctuation

References

External links 

 

2012 non-fiction books
Popular physics books
Astronomy books
Physical cosmology
Cosmology books
Books by Lawrence M. Krauss
Cosmogony
Free Press (publisher) books